Daniel Coleman DeJarnette Sr. (October 18, 1822 – August 20, 1881) was a prominent Virginia politician, serving in the United States Congress and then in the Confederate Congress during the American Civil War.

Biography
DeJarnette was born in Caroline County, Virginia, and studied at Bethany College. He was a member of the Virginia House of Delegates from 1853 to 1858, when he was elected as an Independent Democrat to the United States House of Representatives, with 50.45% of the vote defeating Democrat John Caskie, where he served from 1859 to 1861.

He represented Virginia in both the First Confederate Congress and the Second Confederate Congress.

In 1872 Governor Gilbert Carlton Walker appointed him to the Board of Visitors of the newly established Virginia Agricultural and Mechanical College (now Virginia Tech).

His home, Spring Grove, was listed on the National Register of Historic Places in 1976.

References

 Political graveyard
 Congressional biography

1822 births
1881 deaths
Virginia lawyers
Members of the United States House of Representatives from Virginia
Members of the Confederate House of Representatives from Virginia
Members of the Virginia House of Delegates
People from Caroline County, Virginia
Bethany College (West Virginia) alumni
Virginia Democrats
Virginia Independents
Independent Democrat members of the United States House of Representatives
19th-century American politicians
19th-century American lawyers